"On Fire" is the debut single from Lloyd Banks' debut album, The Hunger for More. It quickly became a nationwide hit and cemented Lloyd Banks' name in the hip hop scene. The single peaked inside the top ten in the U.S., reaching #8. The song samples "The Champ", performed by The Mohawks.

Background
The chorus contains vocals by 50 Cent, though he is uncredited. The song was produced by Eminem and Kwamé. Writing credits were given to Lloyd Banks, Eminem, Kwamé, 50 Cent, Luis Resto and Peter Harmsworth.

The single peaked at #8 on the Billboard Hot 100 and was certified Gold by the RIAA.

Music video
The music video, directed by Jessy Terrero, features Lloyd Banks rapping on the roof of a small building that is on top of a large hotel building. The video contains cameos by fellow G-Unit members 50 Cent, Young Buck and Game, as well as G-Unit artist Olivia. At the end of the video, 50 Cent is seen breaking through glass and the song changes to the chorus and the first verse of the song Warrior, which is also from Lloyd Bank's debut album The Hunger for More.

Charts and certifications

Weekly charts

Year-end charts

Certifications

Release history

References

2004 singles
Lloyd Banks songs
Music videos directed by Jessy Terrero
Song recordings produced by Eminem
Songs written by 50 Cent
2004 songs
G-Unit Records singles
Interscope Records singles
Songs written by Lloyd Banks